The Critics' Choice Television Awards are accolades that are presented annually by the Broadcast Television Journalists Association (BTJA) (US). In 2014, Orange Is the New Black won Best Comedy Series, Best Supporting Actress in a Comedy for Kate Mulgrew and Best Guest Performer in a Comedy for Uzo Aduba. The following year, Orange Is the New Black'''s Lorraine Toussaint won Best Supporting Actress in a Drama. During the 6th Critics' Choice Television Awards Master of None'' won Best Comedy Series. In 2016, John Lithgow and Jane Krakowski won for their supporting roles in drama and comedy, respectively.

Programs

Best Drama Series

Best Comedy Series

Best Limited Series

Best TV Movie

Best Animated Series

Best Comedy Special

Lead Performances

Best Actor in a Drama Series

Best Actress in a Drama Series

Best Actor in a Comedy Series

Best Actress in a Comedy Series

Best Actor in a Movie/Miniseries

Best Actress in a Movie/Miniseries

Supporting Performances

Best Supporting Actor in a Drama Series

Best Supporting Actress in a Drama Series

Best Supporting Actor in a Comedy Series

Best Supporting Actress in a Comedy Series

Best Supporting Actor in a Movie/Miniseries

Best Supporting Actress in a Movie/Miniseries

Guest Performances

Best Guest Performer in a Drama Series

Best Guest Performer in a Comedy Series

See also
Main
 List of awards and nominations received by Netflix

Others
 List of TCA Awards received by Netflix
 List of BAFTA Awards received by Netflix
 List of Golden Globe Awards received by Netflix
 List of Daytime Emmy Awards received by Netflix
 List of Primetime Emmy Awards received by Netflix
 List of Screen Actors Guild Awards received by Netflix
 List of Primetime Creative Arts Emmy Awards received by Netflix

References

Lists of accolades received by Netflix
Lists of television series by network